Placynthium is a genus of lichen-forming fungi in the family Placynthiaceae. Members of this genus are commonly called blackthread lichens.

Species
Placynthium anemoideum 
Placynthium asperellum 
Placynthium australiense 
Placynthium caesium 
Placynthium filiforme 
Placynthium flabellosum 
Placynthium garovaglii 
Placynthium glaciale 
Placynthium hungaricum 
Placynthium lismorense 
Placynthium majus 
Placynthium nigrum 
Placynthium pannariellum 
Placynthium petersii 
Placynthium pluriseptatum 
Placynthium posterulum 
Placynthium pulvinatum 
Placynthium subradiatum 
Placynthium tantaleum  
Placynthium tremniacum

References

Peltigerales
Lichen genera
Taxa named by Erik Acharius
Taxa described in 1810
Peltigerales genera